EKOenergy is an ecolabel for electricity. It is a not-for-profit initiative of the EKOenergy Network, a group of more than 40 environmental organizations from 30 countries. EKOenergy started in 2013 in Europe. Its secretariat is based in Helsinki. Nowadays, EKOenergy is the only international ecolabel for renewable electricity. It is available all over Europe and its material is available in more than 30 languages.

Governance 
Every member organization (all not-for-profit organisations) appoints one person to the EKOenergy Board, the Network’s highest governing authority. The Board takes decisions in consultation with the Advisory Group, which consist of experts from different stakeholder groups, including electricity industry, consumers and environmentalists, among others.

Label  

Other language version of the label can be found in various countries. E.g. EKOénergie in France, EKOenergie in Germany or EKOenergia in Finland.

Criteria of the ecolabel 
Only electricity from renewable sources can be sold as EKOenergy. But EKOenergy is more than just green electricity. EKOenergy also sets criteria for the following aspects:
 Consumer information: Consumers get information about where and how the electricity has been produced.
 Sustainability: EKOenergy takes into account the impacts of electricity production on ecosystem services, habitats and the biodiversity of species. Firstly, it does this by excluding the most environmentally degrading and problematic electricity production methods. Secondly, it finances river restoration through an Environmental Fund. 
 Climate: per every MWh sold, minimum 10 euro cents will be paid into the EKOenergy Climate Fund.
 Tracking of the electricity: The criteria are based on the European best practice, and on the recommendations of RE-DISS/EPED.
 Auditing and verification: All EKOenergy claims are verified by independent auditors.

Users of the Label 
Well known sellers of EKOenergy certified electricity include Fortum, Vattenfall, Ekosähkö and Gesternova. Also sellers of electricity tracking certificates can help consumers to get EKOenergy: e.g. ECOHZ, Green Energy UK and South Pole Group. A full list of licensed sellers can be found on EKOenergy’s website: http://www.ekoenergy.org/buying-ekoenergy/licensees/. An increasing number of EKOenergy consumers uses the label in its own communication: e.g. Otava Printing and Saimaan juomatehdas.

Results

Climate Fund 
For each MWh of EKOenergy sold, the seller pays a minimum of €0.10 to EKOenergy's Climate Fund. This money is used to finance climate projects that would not have happened without the contributions. These projects are managed by experienced organisations. All projects are selected in an open process, with
sellers, buyers and independent experts actively involved. Examples of funded projects: 
Solar panels for Tanzanian schools
Solar panels for schools in Cameroon

EKOenergy's Environmental Fund and nature conservation 
Whenever hydropower is sold with the EKOenergy label, €0.10/ MWh go to the Environmental Fund, to finance river restoration projects. Examples of earlier funded projects:
Murronjoki river restoration (Finland)
Norina river restoration (Latvia)

EKOenergy mentioned in other environmental standards

LEED 
The European versions of the LEED Standard explicitly recommend the use of EKOenergy labelled electricity. Buildings aiming at LEED certification can get extra points if the electricity used in that building is EKOenergy certified. The text “LEED 2009 BD+C Supplemental Reference Guide with Alternative Compliance Paths for Europe” gives EKOenergy the same status as Green-e certified RECs in the US. They write: "The EKOenergy electricity certification scheme represents the best available pan-European option for the sustainable and additional consumption of renewable electricity within Europe. EKOenergy certifies renewable electricity that goes beyond the regulations of European directives and national governments of Europe."

Greenhouse Gas Protocol 
The Greenhouse Gas Protocol is a worldwide standard for carbon accounting. It is a joint product of the World Resources Institute and the World Business Council for Sustainable Development. In January 2015, the Secretariat of the Greenhouse Gas Protocol published the Scope 2 Guidance, which gave advice about carbon accounting. The Guidance refers to EKOenergy several times. Chapter 11, which encourages companies to go one step further, refers to EKOenergy’s Climate Fund.

CDP 
CDP works with 5000 of the largest corporations in the world to help them calculate their carbon emissions and to help them develop effective carbon emission reduction strategies. On page 15 and 16 of its technical notes for accounting of scope 2 emissions (i.e. emissions related to the production of purchased electricity), CDP explains how companies can do more. “Ecolabels are a way for companies to do more with their purchases. EKOenergy, mentioned by the GHG protocol Scope 2 guidance, is such an option: it is a mark of quality which comes on top of tracking certificates. Electricity sold with the EKOenergy label fulfills strict environmental criteria and raises funds for new renewable energy projects. Involvement, transparency and ‘deeds not words’ are important principles of EKOenergy’s work.”

References

External links 
EKOenergy organization website

Renewable energy certification
Renewable energy organizations
Organisations based in Helsinki
Organizations established in 2013
2013 establishments in Finland